Cheese buns or cheese breads may refer to a variety of small, baked, cheese-flavored rolls, a popular snack and breakfast food in Brazil. Cheese buns may be made with cassava and or corn starch, and cheese. In countries where the snack is popular, it is inexpensive and often sold from street vendors, bakeries, in snack shops, and in grocery stores.

 is the classic Brazilian cheese bread. It is considered the most representative recipe of Minas Gerais.

In Ecuador, it has become a habit to eat the  accompanied by fruit yoghurt.

Related cheese buns
Almojábana — throughout Hispanic South America
Chipa — Paraguay
Chipá — Argentina
Cuñapé — Bolivia
Pandebono — Colombia
Pan de queso — Colombia
Pan de yuca — Colombia and Ecuador
Pão de queijo — Brazil
Gougère - France
Khachapuri — Georgia

See also

 List of buns

References

Buns
Cheese dishes
Brazilian cuisine